Lo Chih-en (born 28 December 1988) is a Taiwanese football player. He comes from Atayal tribe. On 17 June 2007, Lo made his debut for Chinese Taipei in the game against Guam of East Asian Cup 2008 preliminary competition, in which he scored 4 goals to help Chinese Taipei's 10-0 victory. His twin brother, Lo Chih-an, is also a footballer. Both of them currently study in National Pingtung University of Education.

In 2009, Lo received futsal training and was called up to present Chinese Taipei in the 2010 AFC Futsal Championship.

International goals

Honours and awards
Intercity Football League Golden Boot (2007)

References

External links
Lo Chih-en at EAFF official site

1988 births
Living people
Atayal people
Taiwanese footballers
Taiwanese men's futsal players
People from Yilan County, Taiwan
Twin sportspeople
Taiwanese twins
Chinese Taipei international footballers
Association football forwards
National Pingtung University of Education alumni